The American Flower-class corvettes were those ships of the Royal Navy's  built for, or operated by, the United States Navy during World War II. These were ten ships of the original Flower class, known as the Temptress class in US service, and fifteen Modified Flowers, as the Action class. They were classified as Patrol Gunboats (PG)

Construction history
In December 1941, after the US entry into World War II, the USN had a large building programme for anti-submarine warfare (ASW) ships, but none nearing completion. To overcome this shortfall, the Royal Navy agreed to transfer a number of ASW ships to the USN, including ten s. These ships had already been in commission and had seen action during the Battle of the Atlantic.

These ships were classified as Patrol Gunboats, and numbered PG 62 to 71, and were referred to as the Temptress class, after the first ship to be recommissioned.

The USN also placed orders for 15 more Flowers from Canadian shipyards. This was met by transferring a number of vessels on order for the RN to USN. These ships were of the Modified Flower type, a design which consolidated the various modifications developed in the course of building the original Flowers.

In the event the USN only took charge of eight of these ships; the other seven were transferred back to the RN under Lend-Lease arrangements.

The US ships were numbered PG 86 to 100 and were referred to as the Action class.

The Temptress class were armed with a 4-inch gun forward, a /50 dual-purpose (DP) gun aft, two 20 mm anti-aircraft guns, two depth charge racks, and four depth charge throwers. The Action class replaced the 4-inch gun with another 3-inch/50 cal. DP gun, and added a Hedgehog anti-submarine mortar.

Temptress class
The ten ships of the Temptress class were originally built for the Royal Navy and saw service there before transfer to the USN.

Action class
The fifteen ships of the Action class were originally ordered for the Royal Navy but transferred before completion to the United States Navy. On completion eight entered service with the USN while the other seven were transferred back to the RN under Lend-lease.

Served in USN

Transferred to RN

Notes

References
 Conway : Conway's All the World's Fighting Ships 1922–1946 (1980) 
Elliott, Peter: (1977) Allied Escort Ships of World War II

External links
 
 

Flower-class corvettes
 
 
 
United Kingdom–United States military relations